Platycheirus nearcticus, the Nearctic broadhand sedgesitter, is a common species of syrphid fly observed in mainly in northeastern North America but scattered more broadly across the continent. Hoverflies can remain nearly motionless in flight. The  adults are also  known as flower flies for they are commonly found on flowers from which they get both energy-giving nectar and protein rich pollen. Larvae are aphid predators.

References

Diptera of North America
Hoverflies of North America
Syrphinae
Insects described in 1990